St Clement's Hospital was a mental health facility at Foxhall Road in Ipswich, Suffolk, England.

History
The hospital, which was designed by William Ribbans in the Italianate style using a single linear corridor layout, opened as the Ipswich Borough Lunatic Asylum in 1870. An extra story was added to the building in the 1890s and it became Ipswich Mental Hospital in 1908. The hospital joined the National Health Service as St Clement's Hospital in 1948.

After the introduction of Care in the Community in the early 1980s, the hospital went into a period of decline and closed in 2002. The main buildings were subsequently converted into offices for administrative use by Norfolk and Suffolk NHS Foundation Trust. This use continued until early 2017 when the buildings were converted into apartments as Belgrove Place.

References

Hospitals in Suffolk
Defunct hospitals in England
Hospital buildings completed in 1870
Hospitals established in 1870
1870 establishments in England
2002 disestablishments in England
Hospitals disestablished in 2002
Former psychiatric hospitals in England
St John's Ward, Ipswich